Christ Church, Greenwich, is an Episcopal church in the Diocese of Connecticut, located in the Putnam Hill Historic District along the Boston Post Road (U.S. Route 1) as it passes through Greenwich in Fairfield County, Connecticut. The parish was established in 1749, and the current church building dates from 1910. The church runs a number of programs and courses and is also known for its choirs.

History of the parish
Anglican worship in Greenwich dates from 1705, when the first Church of England mission was established in the town with the help of the Society for the Propagation of the Gospel in Foreign Parts and the first services were conducted in a private home by the Rev. George Muirson, rector of nearby Grace Church in Rye, New York. Following the appointment of the Rev. Ebenezer Dibblee as missionary to Stamford and Greenwich in 1748, the congregation constructed a small wooden chapel, known as the Horseneck Chapel, on Putnam Hill. Services were held there until the chapel was destroyed in a gale in 1821.  

A new chapel was built on the other side of Putnam Avenue (on the site of the present church) and consecrated in 1834. It was replaced by a larger church in 1857, and again in 1910 when the present building was completed.

Buildings and architecture

The Christ Church campus comprises the church, chapel, parish hall, bookshop, nursery school and various administrative offices and other rooms.

The church, built of stone in the Gothic Revival style, features a square tower with battlements and pinnacles, and stained glass windows.

In 1839 a three acre plot of land was acquired next to the church for a cemetery. 

The parsonage was built in 1843 and replaced in 1997.

Music
Christ Church has an extensive music program, which follows the Royal School of Church Music certification course. There are six choirs, for children and adults, which sing regularly at services and concerts and have also conducted international tours, including to Canterbury Cathedral in England in 2022.

A new Harrison and Harrison pipe organ was installed in 2022, replacing the Austin Organs instrument dating from 1976.

The church today
Christ Church offers regular services of worship, including Evensong, which are also livestreamed, and has a wide range of education and outreach programs. 

It runs a nursery school, which opened in 1961, and a book and gift store, which opened in 1984.

References

Greenwich, Connecticut
Churches in Greenwich, Connecticut
Churches in Fairfield County, Connecticut
Episcopal church buildings in Connecticut
Religious organizations established in 1749
20th-century Episcopal church buildings
Churches completed in 1910